"The Four Horsemen" is the hit single and most famous song on the concept album 666 by the psychedelic rock band Aphrodite's Child. It has received regular airplay on AOR stations since its release in 1972. Like its album, the song is based on The Book of Revelation.

Background
666 was created as a concept album, telling the story of Revelation, the Apocalypse of John. That book of the Bible that was an attack on the tyranny of the Roman empire at the time it was written, and the album goes through a number of famous passages and themes, including the Whore of Babylon (Rome), The Beast (Nero) and, in this case, the Four Horsemen of the Apocalypse. 

The song's lyrics mostly paraphrasing the text of Revelation 6. The song's structure is marked by a dynamic contrast, with Roussos singing over an echoed keyboard drone and wind chimes in the verses, and the chorus containing traditional rock instrumentation highlighted by Sideras' drumming. The song culminates in a two-minute wah guitar solo by Koulouris over heavy drumming by Sideras and a repeated "fa fa fa" background chant by Roussos. 

This lamb is often taken to mean Jesus (who was referred to as The Lamb of God who will take away the sin of the world" in ). But this lamb has "seven horns and seven eyes", and may represent seven Christian groups in the Roman world, oppressed by Nero's tyranny, to whom John is instructed in visions to send the book. The scroll may, indeed, represent the Book of Revelation, itself. 

Either way, the Lamb begins opening the scroll in both the book and the song. It has seven seals, and as each of the first four is opened, it releases some crisis represented by a horseman. These horsemen are described in part, by the color of their horses, especially in the song:

The first horseman holds a bow, and is said to represent either Plague or evangelism of the Gospels. But more specifically it seems to historically refer to Nero, who expelled the author from Rome and plays the role of the Beast in Revelation. The sword-wielding second horseman may represent war, or genocide. "Red" is a legitimate horse color, a reddish brown. The third horseman, mounted on black, is famine, which carries a balance because this is how grain was handed out when food was scarce:

The fourth horse is described using a word "khloros", which probably should be translated from the original greek as "pale". But the Greek-speaking songwriters make a pun here, another meaning of khloros being "green", the origin of the word chlorophyll. The fourth horseman is explicitly named Thanatos, meaning "death" in Greek.

Impact
Receiving significant airplay on album-oriented radio, the song went on to be covered or sampled by a number of bands.

"The Four Horsemen" influenced Beck's "Chemtrails", which has a similar structure, and The Verve's "The Rolling People", which quoted the "fa fa fa" chant. The chorus was also sampled, in a slowed-down fashion, on Daniel Lopatin's "A7", from Chuck Person's Eccojams Vol. 1. The song is very popular among metal and techno acts, forming a significant list of covers and samplings.

Covers
In 2001, the German heavy metal band Axxis included a cover on their album Eyes Of Darkness.
In 2004, Gregorian released a cover of "The Four Horsemen" on their album The Dark Side.
In 2005, German dance group Scooter released a Techno version of "The Four Horsemen" called The Leading Horse on their album Who's Got The Last Laugh Now?.
In 2015, the Greek band Cyanna Mercury (formerly known as Cyanna) covered "The Four Horsemen" on the Death Roots Syndicate compilation The End.
"The Four Horsemen" has proven an especially popular cover among European heavy metal bands. Bands that have covered the song include the Italian band Death SS (on their 2006 album The 7th Seal), the Swedish doom metal band Griftegård (on an EP released through Ván Records in 2015), and the Greek black metal band Rotting Christ (on their 2016 album Rituals).
In 2021 during the COVID-19 pandemic, Belgian drummer and singer Isolde Lasoen covered the song, not only because she thought it was "a terrific tune", but also because she could relate to it. "The four horsemen announce the apocalypse, because - among other things - a strange disease will sweep the world. It instantly made me think of the coronavirus and I always prefer to have a specific reason to release a song."

Samples
The Verve's song "The Rolling People" (from their 1997 album Urban Hymns) borrows its title from "Altamont", while also containing musical elements of "The Four Horsemen". Frontman Richard Ashcroft reportedly mentioned 666 as a strong influence on his music.
Beck's song "Chemtrails" (from his 2008 album Modern Guilt) also resembles "The Four Horsemen".
 Oneohtrix Point Never used a sample on his track "Untitled A7".
 Scooter used a sample in their song "The Leading Horse".
 Gregorian sampled it in their own "The Four Horsemen".

References

1970 songs
1972 singles
Aphrodite's Child songs
Songs with music by Vangelis